Don't Fear the Reaper, the second EP by the duo of Clint Ruin (also known as J. G. Thirlwell) and Lydia Lunch, finds the pair taking on classic covers and new songs in equal measure.  The 1991 disc's title track is Ruin and Lunch's take on the Blue Öyster Cult hit (the other cover sees them reconfiguring The Beatles).

Track listing 

"Serpentine" is a vocal version of "Transcendental Moonshine" from Steroid Maximus' ¡Quilombo!.

Personnel and production
Clint Ruin – Performance, production, recording (2–4), engineering (2–4)
Lydia Lunch – Performance
Martin Bisi – Recording (1), engineering (1)

References

External links 
 
 Don't Fear the Reaper at foetus.org

JG Thirlwell albums
Lydia Lunch albums
1991 EPs
Covers EPs